The president of the Assembly of Kosovo was the presiding officer of the provincial legislature from 1945 to 1990.

See also
President of Kosovo

Sources

Various editions of The Europa world Year book

Assembly, President
Kosovo, Assembly, President